Greatest Hits Vol. II is the second album by the band Cockney Rejects released in 1980. Despite the title, it is not a greatest hits compilation album.

Track listing 
All tracks composed by the Cockney Rejects; except where noted
"War on the Terraces" - 2:39		
"In the Underworld" - 2:46		
"Oi! Oi! Oi!" - 3:26		
"Hate of the City" - 3:05		
"With the Boys" - 2:20		
"Urban Guerilla" - 2:13		
"The Rocker" - 2:32		
"The Greatest Cockney Rip Off" - 2:11		
"Maybe It's Because I'm a Londoner" (Hubert Gregg)	
"Sitting In A Cell" - 2:49		
"On The Waterfront" - 3:55		
"We Can Do Anything" - 2:34		
"It's Alright" - 2:22		
"Subculture" - 1:25		
"Blockbuster" - 4:50 (Nicky Chinn, Mike Chapman)

Personnel 
Cockney Rejects
Vince Riordan - bass, vocals
Mick Geggus - guitar, vocals
Stinky Turner - vocals
Nigel Wolfe - drums

References

1980 albums
Cockney Rejects albums
EMI Records albums